The Fangoria Chainsaw Awards are an award ceremony focused on horror and thriller films. Beginning in 1992, the awards were expanded and an annual ceremony was inaugurated to give out the awards. As of 2015, Fangoria also delivers awards to television series.

Categories

Film
 Best Wide Release Film
 Best Limited Release Film
 Best Streaming Premiere Film
 Best Foreign Language Film
 Best First Feature
 Best Director
 Best Actor
 Best Actress
 Best Lead Performance
 Best Supporting Performance
 Best Supporting Actor
 Best Supporting Actress
 Best Screenplay
 Best Score
 Best Makeup FX
 Best Creature FX
 Best Kill
 Worst Film

Television
 Best TV Series
 Best TV Actor
 Best TV Actress
 Best TV Supporting Actor
 Best TV Supporting Actress
 Best TV SFX

Special awards
 Fangoria Horror Hall of Fame
 Fangoria Lifetime Achievement Award

Ceremonies
 1992 Fangoria Chainsaw Awards
 1993 Fangoria Chainsaw Awards
 1994 Fangoria Chainsaw Awards
 1995 Fangoria Chainsaw Awards
 1996 Fangoria Chainsaw Awards
 1997 Fangoria Chainsaw Awards
 1998 Fangoria Chainsaw Awards
 1999 Fangoria Chainsaw Awards
 2001 Fangoria Chainsaw Awards
 2002 Fangoria Chainsaw Awards
 2017 Fangoria Chainsaw Awards
 2018 Fangoria Chainsaw Awards
 2019 Fangoria Chainsaw Awards
 2020 Fangoria Chainsaw Awards
 2021 Fangoria Chainsaw Awards

Winners and nominees

2022

2021

2020

2019

2016 

Best Wide-Release Film
It Follows – David Robert MitchellCrimson Peak – Guillermo del Toro
The Gift – Joel Edgerton
Krampus – Michael Dougherty
The Visit – M. Night ShyamalanBest Limited-Release/Direct-to-Video FilmWhat We Do in the Shadows – Jemaine Clement and Taika WaititiAnguish – Sonny Mallhi
The Final Girls – Todd Strauss-Schulson
Some Kind of Hate – Adam Egypt Mortimer
We Are Still Here – Ted GeogheganBest Foreign-Language FilmGoodnight Mommy – Veronika Franz and Severin VialaAlleluia – Fabrice Du Welz
Cub – Jonas Govaerts
 – 
When Animals Dream – Jonas Alexander ArnbyBest ActorKurt Russell – Bone Tomahawk
Mark Duplass – Creep
Tom Hiddleston – Crimson Peak
Lou Taylor Pucci – Spring
Henry Rollins – He Never Died
Best Actress
Maika Monroe – It Follows
Abigail Breslin – Maggie
Barbara Crampton – We Are Still Here
Ryan Simpkins – Anguish
Susanne Wuest – Goodnight Mommy
Best Supporting Actor
 – 
Joel Edgerton – The Gift
Larry Fessenden – We Are Still Here
Richard Jenkins – Bone Tomahawk
Rainn Wilson – The Boy
Best Supporting Actress
Jessica Chastain – Crimson Peak
Malin Åkerman – The Final Girls
Deanna Dunagan – The Visit
Kate Greenhouse – He Never Died
Krista Stadler – Krampus
Best Screenplay
What We Do in the Shadows – Jemaine Clement and Taika WaititiAnguish – Sonny Mallhi
The Final Girls – M.A. Fortin and Joshua John Miller
The Gift – Joel Edgerton
The Midnight Swim – Sarah Adina SmithBest ScoreIt Follows – Rich VreelandThe Boy – Volker Bertelmann
Crimson Peak – Fernando Velázquez
The Editor – Claudio Simonetti, Carpenter Brut, Brian Wiacek and Jeremy Gillespie
We Are Still Here – Wojciech GolczewskiBest Makeup/Creature FXKrampus – Weta WorkshopBone Tomahawk – Hugo Villasenor
Deathgasm – Roger Murray, Main Reactor
The Hallow – John Nolan
We Are Still Here – Marcus KochBest TV SeriesAsh vs Evil Dead
Hannibal
Penny Dreadful
Salem
The Walking Dead
Best TV Actor
Bruce Campbell – Ash vs Evil Dead
Hugh Dancy – Hannibal
Josh Hartnett – Penny Dreadful
Mads Mikkelsen – Hannibal
Matt Ryan – Constantine
Best TV Actress
Eva Green – Penny Dreadful
Caroline Dhavernas – Hannibal
Vera Farmiga – Bates Motel
Lady Gaga – American Horror Story: Hotel
Janet Montgomery – Salem
Best TV Supporting Actor
Richard Armitage – Hannibal
Seth Gabel – Salem
Lennie James – The Walking Dead
Rory Kinnear – Penny Dreadful
Evan Peters – American Horror Story: Hotel
Best TV Supporting Actress
Gillian Anderson – Hannibal
Jamie Lee Curtis – Scream Queens
Dana DeLorenzo – Ash vs Evil Dead
Lucy Lawless – Salem
Billie Piper – Penny Dreadful
Best TV Makeup/Creature FX
The Walking Dead – Greg Nicotero and Howard BergerAmerican Horror Story: Hotel – Eryn Krueger Mekash and David LeRoy Anderson
Hannibal – François Dagenais
Salem – Matthew Mungle and Clinton Wayne
The Strain – Steve Newburn, Sean Samson

 2015 Best Wide-Release FilmOculus – Mike FlanaganAs Above, So Below – John Erick Dowdle
Dracula Untold – Gary Shore
Godzilla – Gareth Edwards
The Quiet Ones – John PogueBest Limited-Release/Direct-to-Video FilmThe Babadook – Jennifer KentThe Battery – Jeremy Gardner
Housebound – Gerard Johnstone
The Sacrament – Ti West
Under the Skin – Jonathan GlazerBest Foreign-Language FilmBig Bad Wolves – Aharon Keshales and Navot PapushadoA Girl Walks Home Alone at Night – Ana Lily Amirpour
The House at the End of Time – Alejandro Hidalgo
The Strange Colour of Your Body's Tears – Hélène Cattet and Bruno Forzani
Witching & Bitching – Álex de la IglesiaBest ActorDaniel Radcliffe – Horns
Lior Ashkenazi – Big Bad Wolves
Nick Damici – Late Phases
Jake Gyllenhaal – Enemy
Jared Harris – The Quiet Ones
Best Actress
Essie Davis – The Babadook
Alexandra Essoe – Starry Eyes
Scarlett Johansson – Under the Skin
Marta Milans – Devoured
Tilda Swinton – Only Lovers Left Alive
Best Supporting Actor
Noah Wiseman – The Babadook
David Asavanond – Countdown
Tzahi Grad – Big Bad Wolves
Gene Jones – The Sacrament
Michael Parks – Tusk
Best Supporting Actress
Katee Sackhoff – Oculus
Olivia Cooke – The Quiet Ones
Anne Ramsay – The Taking of Deborah Logan
Rima Te Wiata – Housebound
Mia Wasikowska – Only Lovers Left Alive
Best Screenplay
The Babadook – Jennifer KentHousebound – Gerard Johnstone
Life After Beth – Jeff Baena
Oculus – Mike Flanagan and Jeff Howard
Proxy – Zack Parker and Kevin DonnerBest ScoreUnder the Skin – Mica LeviBig Bad Wolves – Frank Ilfman
Oculus – The Newton Brothers
Only Lovers Left Alive – Jozef van Wissem and SQÜRL
Starry Eyes – Jonathan SnipesBest Makeup/Creature FXHorns – Greg Nicotero and Howard BergerAfflicted – Tamar Ouziel
Dead Snow 2 – Steinaar Karstein and Mike Elizalde
Late Phases – Robert Kurtzman and Brian Spears
Starry Eyes – Hugo Villasenor, SOTA FXWorst FilmOuija – Stiles WhiteAnnabelle – John R. Leonetti
Leprechaun: Origins – Zach Lipovsky
Oculus – Mike Flanagan
Tusk – Kevin SmithBest TV SeriesThe Walking Dead
American Horror Story: Freak Show
Hannibal
Penny Dreadful
True Detective
Best TV Actor
Matthew McConaughey – True Detective
Hugh Dancy – Hannibal
Josh Hartnett – Penny Dreadful
Andrew Lincoln – The Walking Dead
Mads Mikkelsen – Hannibal
Best TV Actress
Sarah Paulson – American Horror Story: Freak Show
Nicole Beharie – Sleepy Hollow
Eva Green – Penny Dreadful
Janet Montgomery – Salem
Anna Paquin – True Blood
Best TV Supporting Actor
Norman Reedus – The Walking Dead
David Bradley – The Strain
Zane Holtz – From Dusk till Dawn: The Series
Rory Kinnear – Penny Dreadful
Finn Wittrock – American Horror Story: Freak Show
Best TV Supporting Actress
Gillian Anderson – Hannibal
Madeleine Martin – Hemlock Grove
Melissa McBride – The Walking Dead
Billie Piper – Penny Dreadful
Deborah Ann Woll – True Blood
Best TV Makeup/Creature FX
The Walking Dead – Greg Nicotero and Howard BergerHannibal – François Dagenais
Penny Dreadful – Nick Dudman
The Strain – Steve Newburn, Sean Samson
True Blood – Todd Masters and Dan Rebert

 2014 Best Wide-Release FilmEvil Dead – Fede ÁlvarezYou're Next – Adam Wingard
Mama – Andrés Muschietti
Insidious: Chapter 2 – James WanBest Limited-Release/Direct-to-Video FilmV/H/S/2 – Simon Barrett, Adam Wingard, Eduardo Sánchez, Gregg Hale, Gareth Huw Evans and Jason EisenerStoker – Park Chan-wook
We Are What We Are – Jim Mickle
Byzantium – Neil Jordan
Berberian Sound Studio – Peter StricklandBest Foreign-Language FilmHere Comes the Devil – Adrián García BoglianoThe Condemned – Roberto Busó-García
Tormented (2011 film) – Takashi Shimizu
Wither – Sonny Laguna and Tommy Wiklund
Horror Stories – Min Kyu-dong, Im Dae-woong, Jung Bum-sik, Hong Ji-young, Kim Gok, Kim SunBest ActorElijah Wood – Maniac
Patrick Wilson – Insidious: Chapter 2
Toby Jones – Berberian Sound Studio
Francisco Barreiro – Here Comes the Devil
Bill Sage – We Are What We Are
Best Actress
Katharine Isabelle – American Mary
Sharni Vinson – You're Next
Mia Wasikowska – Stoker
Saoirse Ronan – Byzantium
Juno Temple – Magic Magic
Best Supporting Actor
Matthew Goode – Stoker
Lou Taylor Pucci – Evil Dead
Joe Swanberg – You're Next
Michael Parks – We Are What We Are
Stephen McHattie – Haunter
Best Supporting Actress
Lili Taylor – The Conjuring
Tristan Risk – American Mary
Julianne Moore – Carrie
Julia Garner – We Are What We Are
Ambyr Childers – We Are What We Are
Best Screenplay
You're Next – Simon BarrettStoker – Wentworth Miller
We Are What We Are – Nick Damici and Jim Mickle
Grabbers – Kevin Lehane
Haunter – Brian KingBest ScoreManiac – RobYou're Next – Jasper Justice Lee, Kyle Mckinnon, Mads Heldtberg and Adam Wingard
Berberian Sound Studio – Broadcast
Byzantium – Javier Navarrete
We Are What We Are – Philip Mossman, Darren Morris and Jeff GraceBest Makeup/Creature FXEvil Dead – Roger Murray and Jane O’KaneFrankenstein's Army – Rogier Samuels
Bad Milo! – Justin Raleigh
Hansel & Gretel: Witch Hunters – Mike Elizalde, Tamar Aviv and Jörn Seifert
Grabbers – Paddy Eason and Shaune Harrison

2006

2002
The 11th Annual Fangoria Chainsaw Awards:Best Wide-Release Film Jeepers Creepers
 The Others
Best Limited-Release Film/Direct-to-Video Film
 Ginger Snaps
 The Convent
Best Actor
 Anthony Hopkins - Hannibal
 Johnny Depp - From Hell
Best Actress
 Nicole Kidman - The Others
 Emily Perkins - Ginger Snaps
Best Supporting Actor
 Jonathan Breck - Jeepers Creepers
 Ian Holm - From Hell
Best Supporting Actress
 Adrienne Barbeau - The Convent
 Mimi Rogers - Ginger Snaps

Best Screenplay
 Karen Walton - Ginger Snaps
 Steven Zaillian and David Mamet - Hannibal
Best Score
 Hans Zimmer - Hannibal
 Trevor Jones - From Hell
Best Makeup/Creature FX
 KNB EFX - Thirteen Ghosts
 Brian Penikas - Jeepers Creepers
Worst Film
 Valentine
 (tie) Hannibal, The Mummy Returns, Thirteen Ghosts
Fangoria Hall of Fame
 Mario Bava (inducted)
 Guillermo del Toro (inducted)

References 

 
American film awards